Korp! Ugala (Fraternity Ugala) is a fraternal organization of Estonian higher education students. It was established at the University of Tartu on 10 November 1913 (28 November 1913 Julian calendar).

Ugala flag colors are: black, blue, white (Fatherland, friendship, honesty)

The Ugala corporation house was planned by member Arnold Matteus who was also a Tartu architect. It was completed in 1939

During the Soviet annexation of Estonia, Ugala was banned for nearly 50 years. However, the members of korp! Ugala gathered in a number of exile branches of the fraternity, most notably in the USA, Canada, Australia and Sweden. Ugala was officially reinstated with Tartu University on 28 October 1988.

Notable members
Peeter Lindsaar (1906–1990), writer
Arnold Matteus (1897–1986), architect
Johannes Orasmaa (1890–1943), general
Valdu Rannaleet (1902–1974), glider
Eduard Tubin (1905–1982), composer
Aarne Viisimaa (1898–1989), opera singer

See also
List of corporations worldwide
Characterization of German Student Corps

External links

1913 establishments in Estonia
Organizations established in 1913